Kazimierz Karczmarz (7 May 1933 — 20 July 2011) was Polish botanist, bryologist , university teacher, long-time head of the Plant Systems Department of the Maria Curie-Skłodowska University, retired in 2003 .

Awards and decorations
Knight's Cross of the Order of Polonia Restituta
Gold Cross of Merit

Hononary medals from Lublin Voivodship and Tarnobrzeg Voivodship

References

1933 births
2011 deaths
20th-century Polish botanists
Bryologists
Knights of the Order of Polonia Restituta